Lucile Wheeler,  (born January 14, 1935) is a former alpine ski racer from Canada. She was a double world champion in 1958, the first North American to win a world title in the downhill event.

Early years
Wheeler was born in Quebec and grew up in the village of Sainte-Jovite in the Laurentian mountains. Her family was instrumental in promoting the sport of skiing and her grandfather George Wheeler built the famous Gray Rocks ski centre at Mont-Tremblant, Quebec. He had moved to Quebec from Chazy, New York in the late nineteenth century, hoping to make it rich in the lumber business, but was wiped out by a forest fire.

Taught to ski at the age of two, Wheeler's skills were such that she was soon competing against older ski racers. At age 10, she finished seventh in a downhill event at Mont Tremblant in a race that was open to participants of all ages. She won the Canadian junior ski championship in 1947 at age 12 and at 14 was selected to compete for Canada at the World Championships in 1950 in Aspen, Colorado, the first major alpine event held outside of Europe. However, her parents felt she was too young at age 15 to miss school and did not allow her to go.

Racing career
The early 1950s was still a time when resources for Canadian skiers were extremely limited. There was very little in the way of government funding to cover expenses for skiers wishing to compete on the world stage or to pay for professional training. Recognizing their daughter's gifts, her parents bore the expense for her to spend several winters training in Kitzbühel, Austria. It paid off when she became the first North American Olympic medalist in the downhill in alpine skiing, winning the bronze in 1956 at Cortina d'Ampezzo, Italy. She followed this with a spectacular performance at the 1958 World Championships in Bad Gastein, Austria, where she won both the downhill and the giant slalom and took silver in the combined. Upon her return to Canada a month later, she received tumultuous receptions.

Wheeler's breakthrough performance resulted in an increase in government funding that enabled other Canadian skiers to compete at the international level. Her achievements were also instrumental in increasing the popularity of the sport both nationwide and in her native Quebec where what was once a remote destination in the Laurentian mountains for only a limited few became a thriving ski area with an abundance of quality facilities that attracts hundreds of thousands of skiers every winter.

World Championship results 

From 1948 through 1980, the Winter Olympics were also the World Championships for alpine skiing.
Wheeler qualified for the 1950 championships, but did not attend.

Olympic results

After racing
Following her retirement from competitive racing at age 24 in 1959, Wheeler, along with Réal Charette, was a ski instructor in a film made at the Banff ski resort that won the American Library Association's award as the best educational sports film of 1960. Wheeler married CFL Hall of Fame player Kaye Vaughan of Kansas in June 1960, and the couple lived for a time in Ottawa, but in 1967 they moved to the village of Knowlton in the heart of a Quebec ski area known as the Eastern Townships. The mother of two children, she organized a ski program at Knowlton High School for children aged 14 and under.

Honours
Wheeler was voted the Lou Marsh Trophy as Canada's most outstanding athlete of 1958 and was inducted into the Canadian Olympic Hall of Fame. In 1976, she was made a member of the Order of Canada, her country's highest civilian honour, and was inducted into the Canadian Sports Hall of Fame. South of the border, Wheeler was inducted into the U.S. Ski Hall of Fame in 1976.

Glen Mountain, a small Quebec ski hill in West Bolton, honoured her with a trail named "The Wheeler."

See also
List of alpine skiing world champions

References

External links
 
 
 Lucile Wheeler – Lou Marsh Trophy 1958
 Lucile Wheeler at Canada's Sports Hall of Fame
 Lucile Wheeler at Canadian Ski Hall of Fame
 Canadian Olympic Hall of Fame – Alpine skiing – Lucile Wheeler
 Lucile Wheeler Vaughan at U.S. Ski and Snowboard Hall of Fame
 
 
 

1935 births
Living people
Canadian female alpine skiers
Lou Marsh Trophy winners
Olympic alpine skiers of Canada
Olympic bronze medalists for Canada
Alpine skiers at the 1956 Winter Olympics
Alpine skiers at the 1952 Winter Olympics
Members of the Order of Canada
Skiers from Montreal
Olympic medalists in alpine skiing
Medalists at the 1956 Winter Olympics